, or , is a historical Japanese text. It was generally believed to have been one of the earliest Japanese histories until the middle of the Edo period, when scholars such as Tokugawa Mitsukuni and Tada Yoshitoshi successfully contended that it was an imitation based on the Nihon Shoki, the Kojiki and the Kogo Shūi. Scholarship on the Kujiki generally considers it to contain some genuine elements, specifically that Book 5 preserves traditions of the Mononobe and Owari clans, and that Book 10 preserves the earlier historical record the Kokuzō Hongi.

Ten volumes in length, it covers the history of ancient Japan through Empress Suiko, third daughter of Emperor Kinmei. The preface is supposedly written by Soga no Umako (+626). While it includes many quotes from Kojiki (712) and Nihon Shoki (720), volumes five and ten contain unique materials. The overall composition is considered as having been compiled between 807 and 936.

The Kujiki contains 10 volumes, but there are 3 false documents also called Kujiki, produced in the Edo period: the 30 volumes Shirakawa edition, Shirakawahon Kujiki (白河本旧事紀) (kept by the Shirakawa Hakuou family), the 72 volumes Enpō edition, Enpōhon Sendai Kuji Hongi Taiseikyō (延宝本先代旧事本紀大成経) (discovered in 1679), and the 31 volumes Sazaki succession edition, Sazaki Denhon Sendai Kuji Hongi Taiseikyō (鷦鷯伝本先代旧事本紀大成経).

The only complete English translation of the Kujiki was made in 2006 by John R. Bentley, who argued based on his examinations of extant manuscripts that the Kujiki was indeed written in the early eighth century CE, before the Kogo Shūi, and as part of the same historiographical movement that produced the Nihon Shoki and the Kojiki. Bentley took the preface, which attributes the work to the early-7th century statesman Prince Shōtoku, to be a later interpolation. In a review for Monumenta Nipponica, Mark Teeuwen criticized Bentley's methodology.


Notes

References

Further reading
 John R. Bentley. The Authenticity of Sendai Kuji Hongi: A New Examination of Texts, With a Translation and Commentary. 
 三重貞亮.『舊事紀訓解』上・下.　明世堂　1944
 飯田季治.『標註　舊事紀校本』.　瑞穂出版　1947
 鎌田純一.『先代舊事本紀の研究』　<校本の部>・<研究の部>.　吉川弘文館　1960
 大野七三.『先代舊事本紀　訓註』. 意富之舎、新人物往来社.　1989. 
 大野七三.『先代旧事本紀　訓註』.　批評社.　2001. 
 三重貞亮.「旧事紀訓解」
 東宮孝行.『先代旧事紀大成経（一）鷦鷯本』. 新日本研究所. 昭和51年(1977)
 宮東斎臣.『鷦鷯伝先代旧事本紀大成経』、先代旧事本紀刊行会、昭和56年(1981)）
 松下松平.「旧事紀白河家三十巻本・解題」
 望月古亶. 「異伝聖徳太子 -日本書紀の稿本か-」. 日本図書刊行会.
 望月古亶. 「記紀漏文I」. 近代文芸社.
 望月古亶. 「記紀漏文II」. 近代文芸社.
 須藤太幹. 『先代舊事本紀大成経』全９巻.　先代舊事本紀研究会.　平成13年(2001)

External links
 私本 先代舊事本紀 (Big5 Chinese) Online text of Kujiki.
 『先代旧事本紀』の現代語訳（ＨＩＳＡＳＨＩ） Online text of Kujiki in modern Japanese.

Late Old Japanese texts
10th-century books
Shinto texts
Japanese false documents
History books of the Heian Period